HD 206267A is a hierarchical triple star system in the northern circumpolar constellation of Cepheus. Two of the members form a spectroscopic binary that orbit each other with a period of 3.7 days, while a third member lies further away—it is unclear whether this third member is gravitationally bound to the pair. The system is emitting a stellar wind that reaches an exceptional velocity of 3,225 km/s, among the highest measured for stars of this type.

This stellar system lies in the nebula IC 1396. All three components are massive stars, and the intense ultraviolet radiation they give off ionizes the gas of IC 1396, and causes compression denser globules of the nebula, leading to star formation. The stellar wind produced by the stars is strong enough to strip nearby stars of their protoplanetary disks.

References

External links
 http://jumk.de/astronomie/big-stars/hd-206267.shtml

Mass Proof
https://www.researchgate.net/publication/238537453_The_Components_of_the_HD_206267_A_Triple_Star_System

Cepheus (constellation)
206267
8281
Triple star systems
O-type main-sequence stars
106886
Durchmusterung objects